James Kenney may refer to:

Jim Kenney (born 1958), Philadelphia mayor
James J. Kenney (1869–1916), fire chief in Berkeley, California
James FitzGerald-Kenney (1878–1956), senior Irish politician
James Kenney (dramatist) (1780–1849), British dramatist
James Kenney (actor) (1930–1987), British actor in Expresso Bongo
James A. Kenney III (born 1937), Maryland state court judge

See also
James Kenny (disambiguation)